The Long Road Home: The Ultimate John Fogerty/Creedence Collection is a compilation album by American roots rock singer-songwriter John Fogerty, released on November 1, 2005, by Fantasy Records. It compiles songs from Fogerty's solo career and his band Creedence Clearwater Revival. The title refers to Fogerty's return to Fantasy Records, after a lengthy stint with Warner Bros. Records and a brief stint with DreamWorks Records.

The Long Road Home was released to mostly positive reviews from music critics and charted at number 13 on the Billboard 200.

Background 
In 2005, Fantasy Records offered John Fogerty with a record deal, which included the release of The Long Road Home. Fogerty had started his recording career on the label, but his quarrels with former label executive Saul Zaentz during the 1970s led to lawsuits and Fogerty's refusal to perform any of his material from Creedence Clearwater Revival. Fogerty explained how he felt about the album's release on Fantasy in an interview for Entertainment Weekly: "It felt surreal at first, but I've been working alongside the new Fantasy people since the company was sold. Now that all the old bad people are gone, I have no lingering bitterness or anger."

The Long Road Home is a 25-song compilation of most of Fogerty and Creedence Clearwater Revival's best-known songs, some of which are live versions. It was the first album to compile both his and the band's hits.

Critical reception 

In his review for AllMusic, music critic Stephen Thomas Erlewine found the album "enormously entertaining" and said that it adequately summarizes Fogerty's work and serves as proof that he is one of the rock and roll era's greatest songwriters. Robert Christgau, writing in Blender magazine, called it "one of the rare career overviews" that justifies itself by playing as one sequence of "timeless sure-shots." In his review for The Village Voice, Christgau remarked that because of his unchanging musical form and replicable "Creedence sound", the album consistently shows Fogerty as "the original roots-rocker" who displays aspects of his modest personality.

In a less enthusiastic review, Dorian Lynskey of The Guardian criticized the album for emphasizing Fogerty's ordinary boogie songs and omitting the more superior songs that are featured on several other Creedence Clearwater Revival compilations.

Track listing

All songs written and composed by John Fogerty.

Personnel
Credits are adapted from AllMusic.

Musicians 

 Alex Acuña – Percussion
 Kenny Aronoff – Drums
 Ronnie Bowman – Background Vocals
 Bob Britt – Guitar, Slide Guitar, Background Vocals
 Billy Burnette – Guitar, Background Vocals
 Paul Bushnell – Bass Guitar
 Mike Canipe – Guitar
 Doug Clifford – Arranger, Clapping, Drums, Producer, Background Vocals
 Luis Conte – Tambourine  
 Stu Cook – Arranger, Bass Guitar, Clapping, Piano, Upright Bass, Producer, Background Vocals
 Creedence Clearwater Revival – Primary Artist  
 Howie Epstein – Bass Guitar
 John Fogerty – Acoustic Guitar, Arranger, Bass Guitar, Clapping, Compilation Producer, Composer, Congas, Cowbell, Dobro, Drums, Electric Sitar, Guitars, Harmonica, Main Personnel, Mandolin, Maracas, Mixing, Organ, Percussion, Piano, Primary Artist, Producer, Saxophone, Tambourine, Tumba, Vocals, Background Vocals

 Tom Fogerty – Clapping, Rhythm Guitar, Background Vocals
 Ryan Freeland – Clapping
 Bob Glaub – Bass Guitar
 George Hawkins – Bass Guitar, Background Vocals
 John Molo – Drums
 Matt Nolen – Guitar, Keyboards
 Don Rigsby – Background Vocals
 Elliot Scheiner  Producer  
 Johnny Lee Schell – Guitar  
 Kenny Smith – Background Vocals 
 Benmont Tench – Organ  
 Julia Waters – Background Vocals
 Oren Waters – Background Vocals
 Maxine Willard Waters – Background Vocals

Additional personnel 
 Abbey Anna – Art Direction  
 Jim Bessman – Liner Notes  
 Danielle Brancazio – Art Direction, Package Design  
 Dan Certa – Mixing  
 Bob Fogerty – Clapping, Photography  
 Julie Fogerty – Art Direction  
 Brian Lima – Photography  
 Bob Ludwig – Compilation Mastering, Mastering  
 Norman Seeff – Photography

Charts

Certifications

References

Further reading

External links
 
 John Fogerty official site
 Fantasy official site

John Fogerty albums
2005 compilation albums
Fantasy Records compilation albums
Albums produced by John Fogerty